Arazi Ashayir Kurki (also Romanized as Ārāz̤ī ʿAShāyīr Kūrkī) is a village in Najafabad Rural District, in the Central District of Sirjan County, Kerman Province, Iran. At the 2006 census, its population was 50, in 10 families.

References 

Populated places in Sirjan County